Kara McGaw (born 11 April 1966) is a Canadian softball player. She competed in the women's tournament at the 1996 Summer Olympics.

References

External links
 

1966 births
Living people
Canadian softball players
Olympic softball players of Canada
Softball players at the 1996 Summer Olympics
Sportspeople from Toronto